After the Russian doping scandal, during several Olympiads Russian athletes were unable to perform under their own flag and anthem and to use the country's name of Russia. Despite the same initial reason for these sanctions, during this period Russian athletes competed at various Olympiads under different names. Until 2018, the Russian Olympic Committee had been suspended from the 2018 Winter Olympics, Russian government officials were barred from the Games, and individual Russian athletes were allowed to compete neutrally under the Olympic Flag and the anthem as an "Olympic Athlete from Russia (OAR)". Prior to 2020, the Russian Olympic Committee was reinstated, but because of the outcome of a decision by the World Anti-Doping Agency (WADA) and the subsequent decision of the Court of Arbitration for Sport (CAS), individual Russian athletes were admitted to the 2020 Summer Games and 2022 Winter Games under the flag of the "Russian Olympic Committee", under the acronym "ROC", and using fragments of Pyotr Tchaikovsky's Piano Concerto No. 1 as an anthem.

Sources outside the IOC may group the performances of "OAR" and "ROC" at the Olympiads, considering them as performances of the same team in the context of a single reason for the appearance of this team.

Medal tables

Medals by Summer Games

Medals by Winter Games

Medals by summer sport

Medals by winter sport

References

External links